Wu Ken (born 1961) is a Chinese diplomat.

Biography
Wu was born 1961 in Hunan, China.

Wu Ken started his diplomatic career in the personnel department of the P.R. China's Ministry of Foreign Affairs. After attending a postgraduate course at the University of Frankfurt, Wu Ken worked as an Attaché of the Ministry of Foreign Affairs in the department of Soviet- and Eurasian affairs.
In 1990 he was appointed as Attaché and 3rd Secretary of the P.R. China's embassy  in Germany. From 1993 to 1998, Wu Ken occupied the following posts: 3rd secretary, assistant sector leader and sector leader of the personnel department of the P.R. China's Ministry of Foreign Affairs. In 1998 he was assigned as embassy counselor of the Chinese embassy in Austria. From 2001 to 2007 he worked as the assistant head and later head of the personnel department of the P.R. China's Ministry of Foreign Affairs. Since 2007 Wu Ken has been the P.R. China's ambassador to Switzerland. In May 2016 he was appointed as ambassador in The Hague, The Netherlands.

References

1961 births
Chinese diplomats
Living people
Chinese expatriates in Germany
Chinese expatriates in Switzerland
People's Republic of China politicians from Hunan